The Stehekin School is a log structure built in 1921 as a school for the community of Stehekin, Washington. The property includes two outhouses and a separate kindergarten cabin. The school was used from 1921 to 1988, when a new school was built.

Stehekin School was added to the National Register of Historic Places in 1974.

References

External links

School buildings on the National Register of Historic Places in Washington (state)
Buildings and structures in Stehekin, Washington
Rustic architecture in Washington (state)
School buildings completed in 1921
Schools in Chelan County, Washington
Defunct schools in Washington (state)
National Register of Historic Places in Chelan County, Washington
1921 establishments in Washington (state)